Charles Kevin Coventry Jr. (born 8 March 1983) is a Zimbabwean cricketer. He is a right-handed batsman and occasional wicket-keeper. He currently holds the record for the highest score by a number 3 batsman in the history of ODI cricket. 

He previously shared the record, with Saeed Anwar, of the highest individual score in a One Day International, 194 not out. This was surpassed by Sachin Tendulkar's 200 on 24 February 2010. His innings is the highest ODI score in a losing cause, surpassing Matthew Hayden's 181. He is one of only a select few sportsmen to wear prescription spectacles while playing sport. He is currently playing club cricket in Dubai along with fellow Zimbabweans such as Glen Querl and Bradley Staddon.

Early life
Coventry was born on 8 March 1983 at Kwekwe, in Midlands in Zimbabwe. The son of Charles "Chuck" Coventry, who is one of the leading umpires in Zimbabwe, with international experience, he was born into a strong cricket family. His father introduced Charles to cricket from a young age, in their back garden and also the nets at the Bulawayo Athletic Club. Chuck has coaching experience and he gave Charles a strong grounding in technique and attitude.

Coventry began playing proper cricket in the third grade in Whitestone School, for whom he played two years in the colts team and two in the senior. His best performance was taking a hat-trick with his leg breaks. In his final two years he represented Matabeleland Primary Schools team, in the national Primary Schools Cricket Weeks, scoring a couple of fifties but not making it into the national age group side. He went to High School at Christian Brothers College, Bulawayo, and was selected for the national U14s side, progressing through the U16s and U19s as well. His best performance was 94 against the South African side Northerns. He played for CBC Senior team for two years, having scored a hundred against the strong St. Johns U16 side.

In Form One at CBC, Coventry started playing club cricket for the Bulawayo Athletic Club, starting off in the Third XI but progressing quickly into the Firsts. BAC encouraged him to take up wicketkeeping, a role which he has undertaken for the Matabeleland Tuskers.

Cricket career

Domestic
Coventry made his Logan Cup debut aged only 15. He had taken his gear along to a match his father was going to umpire "just in case" but due to a mix-up a Matabele player failed to arrive on time and Coventry was told he would be playing. He went in to bat at five, with Matabeleland on 66/3 chasing Mashonaland's total of 243. Coventry immediately got hit by Andy Blignaut, and was facing three other international bowlers in the shape of Eddo Brandes, Paul Strang and Everton Matambanadzo. He admitted to John Ward that the pacemen were far quicker than any he had faced before, but he stuck in, scoring 33, the third highest score of the innings, off 121 before being run out. Coventry paid credit to Guy Whittall for helping him through his innings, telling him to concentrate and revealing the strengths of the bowlers. Since his debut, Coventry has been a Matabele regular, opening the innings.

In 2002 Coventry applied to and was accepted by the CFX Academy, doing well there before returning to Matabeleland. At this time he also represented Zimbabwe at Under-19 level and played in eight Youth One Day Internationals during the 2001–02 Under-19 World Cup in New Zealand.

When the rebellion struck in 2005 Coventry initially joined it but returned along with Gavin Ewing and Barney Rogers. He did not play for Zimbabwe in Bangladesh or South Africa, but continued good domestic form saw him picked as Zimbabwe A's wicket-keeper for the series against Pakistan A. Coventry did not play in either of the four-day "Tests", with first Neil Ferreira and then Brendan Taylor being preferred but he did play in the two "ODIs". In the first match he scored 6, as Zimbabwe lost, but in the second he produced a fine innings that catapulted him into national contention.

Zimbabwe, under the captaincy of Stuart Carlisle, had been put in to bat and fine spells from Najaf Shah and Mohammad Khalil had left Zimbabwe A reeling on 54/4. Coventry proceeded to launch an inspired counter-attack, first with Stuart Matsikenyeri, who scored a gritty 55 at the top of the order, in a partnership of 68, then Blessing Mahwire dug in with Coventry too, Mahwire scoring 41 in a hundred-run stand for the seventh wicket. Coventry finished on 102* off 143 balls. The innings proved to be the match-winning contribution as Pakistan A subsided to 181a/o, well short of Zimbabwe A's 232.

Coventry currently plays for Matabeleland Tuskers in the Zimbabwean domestic competition. So far his form has been disappointing in the Logan Cup, averaging only 23 despite five fifties, a top score of 90* and 1,063 career runs. In the One Day Competition he has a better record, with a hundred and 7 fifties, 916 career runs and an average of 30.

Charles Coventry played for United Services (Sports) Cricket Club in Portsmouth for the 2006 season. He contributed massively as batsman to the club. USCC compete for Southern Premier league division three. This is confirming by his club mate at USCC Muheed Jeeran, a Sri Lankan wrist spinner. Coventry good form in Twenty20 cricket continued when during the Stanbic Bank 20 Series he scored 67* off 40 balls to guide his team the Matabeleland Tuskers to third place when they beat the Southern Rocks by nine-wickets.

International

Good domestic form saw Coventry called up for the full national squad to tour England in 2003. He was thrown in as opener in a One Day International against England at Bristol, but struggled, scoring three off 10 balls and he was subsequently dropped for the Australia tour. He did not play again until 2005, when, after scoring a century against Pakistan A, Coventry returned to the side as a supersub against New Zealand. In a match that Zimbabwe lost heavily, Coventry scored an entertaining 25. He subsequently played in the next three ODIs against New Zealand and India scoring 0, 35 and a fine 74 in the final match.

Later in the summer Coventry made his Test debut against India at Bulawayo, batting in the lower order with his customary aggression, and did better than many other Zimbabweans, scoring 2, 24, 27 and 35 in the two heavy Test defeats.

In 2006 he played in a number of one day matches against Kenya and went on the tour to the West Indies, however, after a discipline issue he was sent home early. As a result, he found himself out of the side again and he subsequently did not play at international level again until August 2009 when he returned to the Zimbabwean side to play a five match one-day series against Bangladesh.

On 16 August 2009 in the fourth One Day International against Bangladesh at the Queens Sports Club in Bulawayo, Coventry scored 194 not out, his first century at international level. It also equalled the then-record score set by Saeed Anwar for the highest individual innings in a One Day International, now bettered by Rohit Sharma (264) Sri Lanka tour of India, 4th ODI: India v Sri Lanka at Eden Gardens,

Coventry's 194* not out is also the highest ODI score in a losing cause, surpassing Matthew Hayden's 181.

Charles Coventry also set a record for the highest maiden ton for any player in ODI history (194*).

Charles Coventry's 194* is still the highest ever ODI score batting at number 3 position.

References

External links
Charles Coventry
Short fuse, long haul
Most runs in an innings

1983 births
Living people
Alumni of Christian Brothers College, Bulawayo
Sportspeople from Kwekwe
Zimbabwean cricketers
CFX Academy cricketers
Matabeleland cricketers
White Zimbabwean sportspeople
Zimbabwean people of British descent
Zimbabwe One Day International cricketers
Zimbabwe Twenty20 International cricketers
Zimbabwe Test cricketers
Cricketers at the 2011 Cricket World Cup
Rajshahi Royals cricketers